Abraham Inanoya Imogie is an Afemai (Edo state) Nigerian scholar and former secretary for Education in the short lived interim administration of Ernest Shonekan.
During his tenure, he tried to reduce the depth of federal control of schools and the lifting of foreign sanctions on Nigeria in order to ensure effective cooperation between Nigeria and foreign educational institutions.

Notes

Nigerian academics
Living people
Education ministers of Nigeria
Year of birth missing (living people)
People from Edo State